The 1962 Cal Poly Mustangs football team represented California Polytechnic State College—now known as California Polytechnic State University, San Luis Obispo—as a member of the California Collegiate Athletic Association (CCAA) during the 1962 NCAA College Division football season. Led by first-year head coach Sheldon Harden, Cal Poly compiled an overall record of 4–5 with a mark of 3–3 in conference play, tying for third place in the CCAA. The Mustangs played home games at Mustang Stadium in San Luis Obispo, California.

Schedule

Team players in the NFL
No Cal Poly Mustangs were selected in the 1963 NFL Draft.

The following finished their college career in 1962, were not drafted, but played in the NFL.

Notes

References

Cal Poly
Cal Poly Mustangs football seasons
Cal Poly Mustangs football